David Morisset may refer to:
David Morisset (ice hockey) (born 1981), former NHL player
The pen name of David Andrews